Xenopoma is a genus of land snails with an operculum, terrestrial gastropod mollusks in the family Annulariidae.

Species 
Species within the genus Xenopoma include:
Xenopoma aguayoi Torre & Bartsch, 1941
Xenopoma hendersoni Torre & Bartsch, 1941
Xenopoma humboldtianum (Pfeiffer, 1867)
Xenopoma hystrix (Wright in Pfeiffer, 1862) - type species
Xenopoma spinosissimum Torre & Bartsch, 1941

References 

 Pfeiffer, L., 1861 Malakozoologische Blätter, 8:

Annulariidae